In enzymology, a carboxylate reductase is an enzyme that catalyzes the chemical reaction

an aldehyde + acceptor + H2O  a carboxylate + reduced acceptor

The 3 substrates of this enzyme are aldehyde, acceptor, and H2O, whereas its two products are carboxylate and reduced acceptor.

This enzyme belongs to the family of oxidoreductases, specifically those acting on the aldehyde or oxo group of donor with other acceptors.  The systematic name of this enzyme class is aldehyde:acceptor oxidoreductase. This enzyme is also called aldehyde:(acceptor) oxidoreductase.  This enzyme participates in pyruvate metabolism.  It employs one cofactor, tungsten.

References

 

EC 1.2.99
Tungsten enzymes
Enzymes of unknown structure